The King of the Kongo (1929) is a Mascot film serial, and was the first serial to have sound, although only partial sound ("Part Talking") rather than the later (and now standard) "All-Talking" productions with complete sound.  The first episode was a "three reeler" with the remaining nine episodes being "two reelers" (approximately 15 minutes per film reel).

Plot
Independently, the two protagonists, Diana Martin and Secret Service agent Larry Trent, are searching the jungle for missing relatives, her father and his brother.  Tied up in this plot are ivory smugglers and a lost treasure hidden in the jungle.

Cast
Jacqueline Logan as Diana Martin
Walter Miller as Larry Trent,  Secret Service Agent
Richard Tucker as Chief of the Secret Service
Boris Karloff as Scarface Macklin, included in the film as a red herring (Spoiler Alert: He is actually the heroine's missing father).
Larry Steers as Jack Drake
Harry Todd as Commodore
Richard Neill as Prisoner
Lafe McKee as Trader John
J.P. Leckray as Priest
William P. Burt as Mooney
J. Gordon Russell as Derelict
Robert Frazer as Native chief
Ruth Davis as Poppy
Joe Bonomo as Gorilla

Production
The King of the Kongo was the first film serial to have any sound element.  Larger serial-producing studios (for example, Pathé and Universal Studios) were reluctant to change away from silent production (although Universal released their own Part-Talking serial, Tarzan the Tiger, later in the same year) while smaller studios could not afford to do so.  Legend has it that producer and studio owner Nat Levine carried the sound discs in his lap from Los Angeles to New York City, by train and aeroplane, for them to be safely developed.  For financial reasons, these discs could not have been repaired or replaced if anything had gone wrong.  This was two years after the first Part-Talking film, The Jazz Singer (1927), had been released and a year after the first "All-Talking" film, Lights of New York (1928).

Despite an announcement that two versions of this serial would be released, (a "Part Talking" version and a silent version intended for theatres not yet equipped for sound), no evidence for a silent version's ever being released exists.  Some of the video bootlegs of the film are the sound version with the sound credits excised.

King of the Kongo is sometimes misreported as an alternate title for the 1931  serial King of the Wild, which also starred Boris Karloff.

Stunts
Joe Bonomo
Yakima Canutt

Chapter titles
Into the Unknown
Terrors of the Jungle
Temple of Beasts
Gorilla Warfare
Danger in the Dark
The Fight at Lions Pitt
The Fatal Moment
Sentenced to Death
Desperate Choices
Jungle Justice

Preservation status

Chapter 1 (three reels)    • Into the Unknown  (no sound known to exist)
Chapter 2 (two reels) 	• Terrors of the Jungle (no sound)
Chapter 3 (two reels)	• Temple of Beasts (no sound)
Chapter 4 (two reels)	• Gorilla Warfare (sound disc for reel 2 survives)
Chapter 5 (two reels)	• Danger in the Dark (sound discs for both reels survive) restoration was finished in 2013
Chapter 6 (two reels)	• The Fight at Lions Pit (sound discs for both reels survive) National Film Preservation Foundation project began fall 2014
Chapter 7 (two reels)	• The Fatal Moment (sound disc for reel 2 survives)
Chapter 8 (two reels)	• Sentenced to Death (sound disc for reel 2 survives)
Chapter 9 (two reels)	• Desperate Choices (sound disc for reel 1 survives)
Chapter 10 (two reels)	• Jungle Justice (National Film Preservation Foundation restoration project began as of June 2014)

In 2011, collector/historian Eric Grayson, owner of a 16mm silent print, restored the sound to several scenes of the film, using discs from Ron Hutchinson's Vitaphone Project.  These reels were Chap 5 r1, Chap 5 r2, and Chap 6  r2.  The results of some of the talking scenes have been posted on YouTube.

In 2012, a Kickstarter successfully helped fund a restoration of Chapter 5.  National Film Preservation Foundation grant is underway for Chapter 10. A grant for Chapter 6 was issued in June 2014.

References

External links
 
 King of the Kongo at SilentEra
 

1929 films
1929 adventure films
American black-and-white films
American silent serial films
1920s English-language films
Mascot Pictures film serials
Films directed by Richard Thorpe
Transitional sound films
Films produced by Nat Levine
American adventure films
1920s American films
Silent adventure films